Flyway is an American literary magazine founded by Stephen Pett in 1995.  It is based at Iowa State University in Ames, Iowa.  Genre editors included Sheryl St. Germain, Debra Marquart, Andie Dominick, Sam Pritchard, and Gary Whitehead. Flyway became Flyway:  Journal of Writing and Envirornment 2009, in concert with the creation of Iowa State University's prestigious MFA Program in Creative Writing and Environment.  Students from the program serve as genre editors and readers. Flyway publishes fiction, essays and poetry with environmental themes.  From its beginnings, Sheryl Kamps has provided technical support.  Pieces that have appeared in Flyway have been selected for inclusion in the Best American anthologies and shortlisted for the Pushcart Prize.  In 2012, in part because of the economic pressures of print, and in part because the staff was excited by the dynamic possibilities of a digital form, Flyway suspended its print issues and moved entirely online.

Notable contributors 

Christine D. Allen-Yazzie
Jacob M. Appel
Madison Smartt Bell
Stephen Dixon
Mylène Dressler
Philip Heldrich
Ray A. Young Bear
Dan O'Brien
Sandra Kohler

George Looney
Laurel Nakadate
Michael Martone
Jane Smiley
Todd Davis
Joseph Geha
Rick Bass
Amy Fleury
Christina Eisenberg
Virgil Suarez
Ted Kooser

See also
List of literary magazines

References

External links
 Flyway Homepage

1995 establishments in Iowa
2012 disestablishments in Iowa
American literature websites
Defunct literary magazines published in the United States
Iowa State University
Magazines established in 1995
Magazines disestablished in 2012
Magazines published in Iowa
Online literary magazines published in the United States
Online magazines with defunct print editions
Student magazines published in the United States